Adrian Gunnell (born 24 August 1972) is an English former professional snooker player from Telford. He has reached the last-16 in four world ranking events (three in Asia, in three different seasons, and at the 2008 Grand Prix), but has yet to progress beyond that stage. He has yet to qualify for the final stages of the World Championship.

While practising in 2003 he pulled off the remarkable feat of compiling three 147 breaks in four frames, the only player to do so. He has not been able to bring that kind of form to the tournaments, but he has compiled a 147 in tournament play. He is noted for taking a long time to play safety shots.

Notable victories he achieved during the 2007–08 season included beating Marco Fu 5–3 in last 48 of the Northern Ireland Trophy, and Matthew Stevens 9–7 at the same stage of the 2007 UK Championship from 5–7 behind, to qualify for the final stages of the event played in his home town for the first time. He lost to Peter Ebdon 5–2 and Ding Junhui 9–3 in the last 32 of both tournaments respectively, but his consistent performances took him up to number 36 in the 2008/2009 rankings. He also had a notable run in the 2008 Grand Prix, upsetting former World Champion Shaun Murphy 5–3 in the first round (Murphy went on to win the UK Championship and reach the final of the World Championship later in the same season), then coming from 3–0 down against Steve Davis to level at 3–3 and 4–4 and led by over forty points in the deciding frame, before Davis produced a great clearance to the pink to snatch victory.

The 2011/12 season was rather average only qualifying for 2 of the 8 ranking events, the UK Championship and the German Masters, both losing in the first round to Mark Allen and Stephen Lee. At the end of the season, he finished No 69 outside the top 64, but he played in the Q School events but did not manage to qualify for the main tour by reaching the Quarter-finals in any of the 3 events and then lost his place in the main tour soon afterwards.

References

External links

Profile at World Snooker
Profile on the Global Snooker Centre

English snooker players
1972 births
Living people
Place of birth missing (living people)
People from Telford
Sportspeople from Shropshire